Lumaco is a town and commune in Malleco Province in the Araucanía Region of Chile. Its name in Mapudungun means "water of luma". It shares a boundary to the north with the communes of Purén and Los Sauces, to the east with Traiguén and Galvarino, to the south with Cholchol and Carahue in Cautin Province, and the west with Tirúa and Contulmo in the Arauco Province of the Biobío Region.

The area of Lumaco and Purén is rich in Mapuche and early Spanish archaeological sites.

Geography
The epicenter of the 1960 Valdivia earthquake, the largest earthquake ever recorded in the world, was near Lumaco.

Demographics
Of these, 4,132 (36.2%) lived in urban areas and 7,273 (63.8%) in rural areas. The population fell by 7% (853 persons) between the 1992 and 2002 censuses.

Administration
As a commune, Lumaco is a third-level administrative division of Chile administered by a municipal council, headed by an alcalde who is directly elected every four years. The 2008-2012 alcalde is Manuel Painiqueo Tragnolao (PS).

Within the electoral divisions of Chile, Lumaco is represented in the Chamber of Deputies by Gonzalo Arenas (UDI) and Mario Venegas (PDC) as part of the 48th electoral district, together with Angol, Renaico, Collipulli, Ercilla, Los Sauces, Purén and Traiguén. The commune is represented in the Senate by Alberto Espina Otero (RN) and Jaime Quintana Leal (PPD) as part of the 14th senatorial constituency (Araucanía-North).

References 

  Francisco Solano Asta-Buruaga y Cienfuegos, Diccionario geográfico de la República de Chile, Lumaco (Fuerte de), pg. 389

Communes of Chile
Populated places in Malleco Province